The Arab Cup of Ice Hockey was intended to be an annual international ice hockey competition involving teams from Arab nations. The inaugural tournament took place from 16 to 20 June 2008 in Abu Dhabi, United Arab Emirates. A 2009 competition was planned to be held in Kuwait City, Kuwait but was cancelled.

2008 results
The 2008 competition was made up of four teams from Arab nations. All games took place in Abu Dhabi Ice Rink - Zayed Sports Complex. United Arab Emirates won the tournament, beating Kuwait 4 – 1 in the gold medal game.

Standings

Fixtures

Semi-finals

Bronze medal game

Gold medal game

2009 results 
The tournament was planned to be held in Kuwait but was cancelled.

References

External links 
Moroccan Ice Hockey Federation Website
Arab Ice Hockey Federation Website
Algerian Ice Hockey Association Website
Official Algeria Myspace Page

Ice hockey tournaments in Asia
2008 in Emirati sport
2008
Arab